Leandro Rizzuto Jr. (born March 20, 1962) is an American businessman who was US Consul General in Hamilton, Bermuda during the Trump administration. He was unsuccessfully nominated by President Donald Trump to become the next United States Ambassador to Barbados. Trump subsequently appointed him to the diplomatic post in Bermuda, a position which did not require confirmation by the Senate.

He is the son of Leandro Rizzuto, billionaire founder of Conair Corporation. Rizzuto previously worked as a senior executive in his father's company.

Early life
Leandro Rizzuto Jr was born on March 20, 1962, in Brooklyn, New York, the son of Leandro Rizzuto and his wife Rita Rizzuto.

Rizzuto studied marketing at Arizona State University from 1980 to 1982, but left to work for the family businesses.

Career

Rizzuto spent his entire career with Conair Corporation, of which his father was chairman and near 100% owner until his death in December 2017, rising to senior vice president for professional global business units.

During the 2016 presidential campaign, he spread fringe conspiracy theories and made inflammatory comments about Trump's political opponents, such as Ted Cruz, John Kasich and Scott Walker.

In January 2018, Donald Trump nominated Rizzuto to be Ambassador Extraordinary and Plenipotentiary to Barbados, St. Kitts and Nevis, and Saint Lucia. Just two weeks later, Rizzuto pledged more than $15,000 to fund Trump's club at Mar-a-Lago. Rizzuto had donated over $345,000 to the Trump campaign and state and national Republican parties in the 2016 cycle. Rizzuto's nomination failed, as the Senate sent Rizzuto's nomination back in January 2020.

In May 2020, Trump gave Rizzuto the position of principal officer at the US Consulate General in Hamilton, Bermuda. This position did not require confirmation by the Senate.

His appointment to the role in Bermuda was met with resistance and protest.

Personal life
He is married to Denise Rizzuto and they have three children.

References

Living people
21st-century American businesspeople
Arizona State University alumni
American people of Italian descent
Ambassadors of the United States to Barbados
Ambassadors of the United States to Saint Kitts and Nevis
Trump administration personnel
1962 births